Yelkhovitsa is a rural locality (a village) in Vorshinskoye Rural Settlement, Sobinsky District, Vladimir Oblast, Russia. The population was 23 as of 2010.

Geography 
Yelkhovitsa is located 13 km northeast of Sobinka (the district's administrative centre) by road. Kuzmino is the nearest rural locality.

References 

Rural localities in Sobinsky District